Nanohammus grangeri is a species of beetle in the family Cerambycidae. It was described by Stephan von Breuning in 1962. It is known from Vietnam and Laos.

References

Lamiini
Beetles described in 1962